Hiram V. Willson (April 1808 – November 11, 1866) was a United States district judge of the United States District Court for the Northern District of Ohio.

Education and career

Born in April 1808, in Madison County, New York, Willson graduated from Hamilton College in 1832 and read law, first in the office of Jared Willson of Canandaigua, New York, then in the office of Francis Scott Key in Washington, D.C. After moving to Painesville, Ohio in 1833, he was admitted to the bar and entered private practice with Henry B. Payne in Cleveland, Ohio from 1834 to 1855. In 1852, Willson was nominated by the Democratic Party for United States House of Representatives, but lost to his law partner Edward Wade of the Free Soil Party. In 1854, the Cleveland Bar Association sent Willson to lobby Congress to divide the state of Ohio into two Federal Judicial Districts. The effort was successful.

Federal judicial service

He was confirmed by the United States Senate on February 20, 1855, and received his commission the same day. His service terminated on November 11, 1866, due to his death of consumption (tuberculosis) in Cleveland. Some months before his death, he was received into the First Presbyterian Church.

Notable case

Willson's most notable case was the trial of the Oberlin–Wellington Rescue conspirators in 1858.

References

Sources

 

1866 deaths
Judges of the United States District Court for the Northern District of Ohio
United States federal judges appointed by Franklin Pierce
19th-century American judges
Lawyers from Cleveland
Hamilton College (New York) alumni
Ohio lawyers
People from Madison County, New York
1808 births
Ohio Democrats
19th-century American politicians